Armand Antoine Agénor de Gramont, 12th Duc de Gramont (29 September 1879 – 2 August 1962) was a French nobleman, scientist and industrialist. He was known by the courtesy title of Duc de Guiche until 1925, when he succeeded his father as Duc de Gramont. He was the eldest son of Antoine Alfred Agénor de Gramont, 11e duc de Gramont and Marguerite de Rothschild.

In 1904, he married Élaine Greffulhe, the daughter of Count Greffulhe and his wife, Élisabeth de Riquet de Caraman-Chimay (said to be a model for the Duchess of Guermantes in Marcel Proust’s novel, À la recherche du temps perdu). The marriage produced five children.

A rare film clip shows Proust (in bowler hat and grey coat) at Gramont's wedding in 1904. Proust’s wedding gift to Gramont was apparently a revolver in a leather case inscribed with verses from the bride’s childhood poems.

References

External links
 

1879 births
1962 deaths
Dukes of Gramont
Rothschild family
French people of German-Jewish descent

Dukes of Guiche